Punia is a territory in Maniema province of the Democratic Republic of the Congo.

Territories of Maniema Province